Adanchuli is a rural municipality located in Humla District of Karnali Province of Nepal.

The rural municipality is divided into total 6 wards and the headquarters of the rural municipality is situated at Srinagar.

Demographics
At the time of the 2011 Nepal census, 99.8% of the population in Adanchuli Rural Municipality spoke Nepali as their first language; 0.2% spoke other languages.

In terms of ethnicity/caste, 51.0% were Chhetri, 18.4% Kami, 14.5% Thakuri, 5.5% Damai/Dholi, 5.2% Hill Brahmin, 3.6% Sarki, 1.6% Magar and 0.3% Gurung.

In terms of religion, 99.3% were Hindu, 0.7% Christian and 0.1% Buddhist.

References

External links
 Official website

Populated places in Humla District
Rural municipalities in Karnali Province
Rural municipalities of Nepal established in 2017